Harrison Township is one of the twenty-five townships of Muskingum County, Ohio, United States.  The 2000 census found 1,638 people in the township, 869 of whom lived in the unincorporated portions of the township.

Geography
Located on the southern edge of the county, it borders the following townships:
Wayne Township - north
Blue Rock Township - east
Bloom Township, Morgan County - southeast
York Township, Morgan County - southwest
Brush Creek Township - west

The village of Philo is located in northern Harrison Township.

Name and history
Harrison Township was organized in 1839. It is one of nineteen Harrison Townships statewide.

Government
The township is governed by a three-member board of trustees, who are elected in November of odd-numbered years to a four-year term beginning on the following January 1. Two are elected in the year after the presidential election and one is elected in the year before it. There is also an elected township fiscal officer, who serves a four-year term beginning on April 1 of the year after the election, which is held in November of the year before the presidential election. Vacancies in the fiscal officership or on the board of trustees are filled by the remaining trustees.

References

External links
County website

Townships in Muskingum County, Ohio
Townships in Ohio